Eder Omar Cruz Jiménez (born January 20, 1989) is a Mexican professional footballer who last played for Correcaminos.

References

External links
 

1989 births
Living people
Mexican footballers
Association football forwards
Pachuca Juniors footballers
C.F. Pachuca players
Tampico Madero F.C. footballers
Club León footballers
Murciélagos FC footballers
Altamira F.C. players
Tlaxcala F.C. players
Loros UdeC footballers
Mineros de Zacatecas players
Liga MX players
Ascenso MX players
Liga Premier de México players
Tercera División de México players
Footballers from Veracruz
People from Tuxpan, Veracruz